In the field of numerical analysis, particle methods discretize fluid into particles. Particle methods enable the simulation of some otherwise difficult types of problems, at the cost of extra computing time and programming effort. 

Some of particle methods are meshfree methods and vice versa.

History

One of the earliest particle methods is smoothed particle hydrodynamics, presented in 1977. Libersky et al. were the first to apply SPH in solid mechanics. The main drawbacks of SPH are inaccurate results near boundaries and tension instability that was first investigated by Swegle. 

In the 1990s a new class of particle methods emerged. The reproducing kernel particle method (RKPM) emerged, the approximation motivated in part to correct the kernel estimate in SPH: to give accuracy near boundaries, in non-uniform discretizations, and higher-order accuracy in general. Notably, in a parallel development, the Material point methods were developed around the same time which offer similar capabilities. During the 1990s and thereafter several other varieties were developed including those listed below.

List of methods and acronyms

The following numerical methods are generally considered to fall within the general class of "particle" methods.  Acronyms are provided in parentheses.

 Smoothed particle hydrodynamics (SPH) (1977)
 Dissipative particle dynamics (DPD) (1992)
 Reproducing kernel particle method (RKPM) (1995)
 Moving particle semi-implicit (MPS)
 Particle-in-cell (PIC)
 Moving particle finite element method (MPFEM)
 Cracking particles method (CPM) (2004)
 Immersed particle method (IPM) (2006)

See also

 Continuum mechanics
 Boundary element method
 Immersed boundary method
 Stencil code
 Meshfree methods

References

Further reading

 Liu MB, Liu GR, Zong Z, AN OVERVIEW ON SMOOTHED PARTICLE HYDRODYNAMICS, INTERNATIONAL JOURNAL OF COMPUTATIONAL METHODS   Vol. 5   Issue: 1, 135–188, 2008.
 Liu, G.R., Liu, M.B. (2003).  Smoothed Particle Hydrodynamics, a meshfree and Particle Method,  World Scientific, .

External links
 Particle Methods

Numerical analysis
Numerical differential equations
Computational fluid dynamics